Sean Michael Burke is a Perl programmer, author, and linguist. He was a columnist for The Perl Journal from 1998 and has written several dozen Perl modules for CPAN, as well as books for O'Reilly Media.

Software
Burke's Perl modules include the HTML parsing module HTML::TreeBuilder, and Sort::ArbBiLex (arbitrary bi-level lexicographic sorting), used to generate sorting functions for language-specific sorting conventions. Some of Burke's modules, including Class::ISA, I18N::LangTags, and Locale::Maketext, have become part of the standard distribution of Perl. Locale::Maketext is also the basis of the internationalization layer in Request Tracker.

Burke also wrote perlpodspec, the specification for the Pod ("Plain Old Documentation") markup language, which is used for documenting Perl and its modules, and the current generation of Pod parsers, such as Pod::Simple, which are used for generating the HTML documentation on the main CPAN search engine, search.cpan.org.

Bibliography
 Burke, Sean M. Perl & LWP, O'Reilly Media, 2002, .
 Burke, Sean M. RTF Pocket Guide, O'Reilly Media, 2003, .
 Burke, Sean M.  Chapter 5.3: "The design of online lexicons" (p240-249) in A Practical Guide to Lexicography, van Sterkenburg, Piet (editor). A textbook, book #6 in the series Terminology and Lexicography Research and Practice. John Benjamins Publishing Company, 2003.  .
 Phone, Wilhelmina; Olson, Maureen; Martinez, Matilda. (Authors.) Dictionary of Jicarilla Apache: Abáachi Mizaa Iłkeeʼ Siijai. Axelrod, Melissa; Gómez de García, Jule; Lachler, Jordan; and Burke, Sean (Eds.).  Author of its section "Technical Notes on the Production of the Dictionary".  University of New Mexico Press. 2007. .
 Selected Perl Journal articles appear in all three volumes of Best of The Perl Journal.<ref
name="best_tpj_cs">Orwant, Jon (ed.), Computer Science & Perl Programming, 2002, O'Reilly Media, .</ref>

References

External links
 Burke's homepage: http://interglacial.com
 Burke's CPAN modules
 Perl Journal articles on Burke's website
 Perl & LWP, available to read free on Burke's website
 Additional material to the "RTF Pocket Guide": http://interglacial.com/rtf/

Perl people
Living people
Year of birth missing (living people)